Digital terrestrial television in Indonesia (DVB-T2) started in 2009, and in most areas runs alongside the analogue TV system. The phase 1 of nationwide analog shutdown will be done in 166 regencies and cities, including Dumai, Banda Aceh, Batam, Tanjungpinang, Serang, Bali, Samarinda, Tanjung Selor, Tarakan, Makassar and Jayapura started from 30 April 2022 (only Dumai will shut down first while rest of phase one will shut before phase 2 starts) and it simplified in three stages (originally on 17 August 2021 but was postponed due to ongoing COVID-19 pandemic and concern on public readiness). Analog broadcasting station in Jakarta along with 173 regencies/cities non-terrestrial services was officially signed off on 2 November 2022 at midnight (except ANTV, RCTI, MNCTV, GTV and iNews on 3 November 2022 at midnight). Batam, Bandung, Semarang, Surakarta and Yogyakarta followed on 2 December 2022, followed by Surabaya on 20 December 2022, meanwhile, Bali, Medan, Palembang, Banjarmasin and Makassar has been postponed.

History 
On 20 May 2009, two consortium television broadcasters completed a trial run for digital television.

Digital terrestrial television was officially launched on 21 December 2010 on DVB-T system, initially in Jakarta, Surabaya (East Java) and Batam (Riau Islands). The digital broadcast of TVRI Nasional and some local TVRI stations, as well as two initial digital terrestrial channel TVRI 3 (currently TVRI World) and TVRI 4 (currently TVRI Sport) was also launched alongside the system. Among those who launched were President Susilo Bambang Yudhoyono, Minister of Communications and Information Technology Tifatul Sembiring and Chief Director of TVRI Imas Sunarya.

The Indonesian Supreme Court canceled Ministry of Communication and Informatics Regulation No. 22 of 2011. On December 27, 2013, the Ministry of Communication and Informatics released Ministry of Communication and Informatics Regulation No. 32 of 2013.

On March 5, 2015, the State Administrative Court (PTUN) of Jakarta repealed the Ministry of Communication and Informatics Regulation Number 22, from 2011 that had been canceled by the Supreme Court.

Analogue switch-off 
 Phase I (13 August 2008–20 December 2010)
 DTT experiment
 Vacate other primary services (mobile broadband and RFID)
 Phase II (21 December 2010–30 April 2022)
 Analogue TV & DTT co-exist
 Phase III (30 April 2022–2023)
 Analogue TV shut down in stages
 Vacate DTT service using channels 22 to 48
 Vacate mobile broadband phones in the band 694 MHz to 806 MHz
 Phase IV (2023 onwards)
 No analogue TV service
 100% DTT service using channels 22 to 48
First analog broadcasting television station officially turned off on 30 April 2022, followed by another 3 phases of analog shutdown in Indonesia. Analog broadcasts in Jakarta along with 173 regencies/cities non-terrestrial services was shut down completely on 2 November 2022. Only antv, RCTI, MNCTV, GTV and iNews still aired on analog in Jakarta until they shut down on 3 November 2022 at midnight. Batam, Bandung, Semarang, Surakarta and Yogyakarta followed on 2 December 2022; Surabaya on 20 December 2022; Medan and Makassar on 10 January 2023; Banjarmasin on 20 March 2023; and Bali and Palembang on 31 March 2023.

Frequency usage
Indonesia's telecoms services share bandwidth:

 Analogue System: 478 MHz to 806 MHz
 Digital System: 478 MHz to 694 MHz
 Mobile Broadband: 694 MHz to 806 MHz

Regulation
Communication and Information Ministry Regulation No. 32 includes provisions covering terrestrial and broadcast technologies:

 Digital Broadcast through Terrestrial System is served by LPP TVRI, local LPPs, LPS and LPK.
 Multiplexing Broadcast through Terrestrial System is served by LPP TVRI and LPS. These services have to follow open access and non-discriminatory principles.
 Other LPS and LPS with analog broadcast can rent bandwidth from LPS at the discretion of the Communication and Information Minister.
 Local LPPs and LPK with analog broadcast should cooperate with LPP TVRI.

The only significant change between old and new regulations was the elimination of the analog switch-off. The zonal term was changed by provinces and sets the new initial time of digital broadcasts. Zones and Provinces are the same as well as the license. 

The Indonesian Local Television Association (Asosiasi TV Lokal Indonesia - ATVLI) intended to appeal again to the Supreme Court if the new regulation, mainly the multiplexing license selection, is still burdensome for local television broadcasters.

Digital area
Digital area of Communication and Information Ministry Regulation Number 32 established five regions to manage the digital transition:

 Developed Economy Area 1: Jakarta, West Java, Central Java, and East Java initial Q1 2013
 Developed Economy Area 2: Banten, Yogyakarta, Riau Islands initial Q1 2013 and North Sumatra, East Kalimantan initial Q1 2014
 Developed Economy Area 3: Aceh initial Q1 2014, and West Sumatra, Riau, South Sumatra, Lampung, Bali, South Sulawesi, North Sulawesi initial Q3 2014, Jambi, West Kalimantan, Central Kalimantan initial Q4 2014, and Bengkulu, Bangka Belitung, Maluku initial Q1 2015
 Less Developed Economy Area 4: West Nusa Tenggara, East Nusa Tenggara, West Sulawesi, Southeast Sulawesi, Central Sulawesi, South Kalimantan initial Q4 2014 and West Papua, North Maluku, Gorontalo initial Q1 2015
 Less Developed Economy Area 5: Papua initial Q1 2015

The new regulation states that both analog and digital broadcasts can proceed without limit. As of mid-2014 no broadcaster had clearly moved to digital broadcasts.

Broadcasters
As of August 2012, TVRI is the sole broadcaster that broadcasts digital television in Jakarta, Bandung, Surabaya, and Batam. TVRI has 376 analog transmitters of which 30 are ready to switch to digital.

At the end of September 2012, Metro TV had initial broadcast digital television in:
 Jakarta
 Bandung
 Semarang
 Surabaya
 Malingping, Padeglang, Anyer and Cilegon in Banten Province

Distribution
The plan was to distribute 6 million free set-top boxes to low income families, before the 2014 FIFA World Cup. Vendors offered a set-top box that receives signals from DVB-T2 through UHF, so it is unnecessary to change the analogue antenna. The plan did not work and the first distributions of set-top-boxes were done by Banten Sinar Dunia Televisi (BSTV) which got a zone 4 license covering Jakarta and Banten. It was distributed in Malingping, Banten concerning the Proclamation Day on August 17, 2014.

Some brands released LED TVs with built-in DVB-T2.

References

External links 
  (in Indonesian)
 
 

Indonesia
Television in Indonesia